Chris Guest may refer to:
 Christopher Guest, Baron Guest (1901–1984), British judge
 Christopher Guest (born 1948), American actor
 Chris Guest (artist) (born 1979), British artist